Kalleri is a village development committee in Dhading District in the Bagmati Zone of central Nepal. At the time of the 1991 Nepal census it had a population of 7848 and had 1433 houses in it.

References

Populated places in Dhading District